The 2006 WGC-Accenture Match Play Championship was a golf tournament that was played from February 22–26, 2006 at La Costa Resort and Spa in Carlsbad, California. It was the eighth WGC-Accenture Match Play Championship and the first of four World Golf Championships events held in 2006. It was the final time the event would be hosted at La Costa.

Geoff Ogilvy, the 12th seed, won his first World Golf Championships event by defeating Davis Love III 3 and 2 in the 36 hole final. He set a record by playing a total of 129 holes during the tournament, the most by anyone in the eight-year history of the event, which included four consecutive overtime matches at the start of the week. The total prize fund for the championship was $7.5 million, of which Ogilvy's share was $1.3 million.

Tiger Woods set the record for largest victory margin with a 9 and 8 win over Stephen Ames in the first round. Some interpreted Woods' performance as payback for Ames' comments earlier in the week in which he told the Associated Press, "anything can happen, especially where he's hitting it."

Brackets
The Championship was a single elimination match play event. The field consisted of the top 64 players available from the Official World Golf Rankings, seeded according to the rankings. Number 6 Sergio García and number 28 Thomas Bjørn did not play opening spots for number 65 Graeme McDowell and number 67 Stephen Ames (number 66 Craig Parry did not enter).

Bobby Jones bracket

Ben Hogan bracket

Gary Player bracket

Sam Snead bracket

Final Four

Breakdown by country

Prize money breakdown

References

External links
Bracket
ESPN Coverage

WGC Match Play
Golf in California
Carlsbad, California
Sports competitions in San Diego County, California
WGC-Accenture Match Play Championship
WGC-Accenture Match Play Championship
WGC-Accenture Match Play Championship